Tlatelolco (also called Mexico Tlatelolco) was a pre-Columbian altepetl, or city-state, in the Valley of Mexico. Its inhabitants, known as the Tlatelolca, were part of the Mexica, a Nahuatl-speaking people who arrived in what is now central Mexico in the 13th century. The Mexica settled on an island in Lake Texcoco and founded the altepetl of Mexico-Tenochtitlan on the southern portion of the island. In 1337, a group of dissident Mexica broke away from the Tenochca leadership in Tenochtitlan and founded Mexico-Tlatelolco on the northern portion of the island. Tenochtitlan was closely tied with its sister city, which was largely dependent on the market of Tlatelolco, the most important site of commerce in the area.

History

In 1337, thirteen years after the foundation of Tenochtitlan, the Tlatelolca declared themselves independent from the Tenochca and inaugurated their first independent tlatoani (dynastic ruler). Under the king Quaquapitzahuac (1376–1417), the first two stages of the Main Pyramid of Tlatelolco were constructed. Under Tlacateotl (1417–1428), the Tlatelolca assisted the Tenochca in the war against the Tepanec empire, dominated by Azcapotzalco. Shortly thereafter, the first war between the Tenochca and Tlatelolca erupted. Also during Tlacateotl's reign, the third stage of the Main Pyramid was constructed. Under Quauhtlatoa (1428–1460), the Tlatelolca conquered the city-state of Ahuilizapan (now Orizaba, Veracruz), and fought against the people of Chalco along with the Tenochca. The fourth and fifth stages of the Main Pyramid were constructed in this period. The ruler Moquihuix (1460–1473) constructed the sixth stage of the temple, but in 1473, in the Battle of Tlatelolco, he was defeated by the Tenochca tlatoani Axayacatl, and Tlatelolco was made subject to Tenochtitlan. Itzcuauhtzin ruled Tlatelolco during a period in which it was almost completely incorporated into Tenochtitlan.<ref name=Miguel>León-Portilla, M. 1992, 'The Broken Spears: The Aztec Accounts of the Conquest of Mexico. Boston: Beacon Press, </ref>

In his Historia verdadera de la conquista de la Nueva España, conquistador Bernal Díaz del Castillo made several observations regarding Tlatelolco. He opined that its temple was the greatest in all of Mexico. Regarding its marketplace, he wrote that the Spanish "were astonished at the number of people and the quantity of merchandise that it contained, and at the good order and control that was maintained, for we had never seen such a thing before."

During Cortés's siege of Tenochtitlan, the Mexicas would retreat to Tlatelolco, and even achieve a successful ambush against the Spanish conquistadores and their allies, but would ultimately fall along with the rest of the island to Spain. After the completion of the two-year Spanish Conquest of the Aztec Empire in 1521, the Spanish conquerors established the ruins of Mexico-Tenochtitlan as the Spanish capital of New Spain.  The remnants of the indigenous populations of Tenochtitlan and Tlatelolco following the conquest were administered by indigenous elites in the incorporated Indian towns of Santiago Tlatelolco and San Juan Tenochtitlan. Tlatelolco remained an important location in the colonial era, partly because of the foundation there, of the school for elite indigenous men, the Colegio de Santa Cruz de Tlatelolco, which was the first school of higher learning in the Americas.  Today its remains are located within Mexico City.

In the twentieth and twenty-first centuries, archeological excavations have taken place at the Tlatelolco (archaeological site) in what is now part of Mexico City. The excavations of the prehispanic city-state are centered on the Plaza de las Tres Culturas, a square surrounded on three sides by an excavated Aztec site, a 17th-century church called Templo de Santiago, and the modern office complex of the Mexican foreign ministry. In February 2009, the discovery of a mass grave with 49 human bodies was announced by archaeologists. The grave is considered unusual because the bodies are laid out ritually.

 Notes 

Further readingAnales de Tlatelolco, unos annales históricos de la nación mexicana y Códice de Tlatelolco. Edited by Heinrich Berlin and Robert H. Barlow. Mexico 1948.
Barlow, Robert H. Tlatelolco, rival de Tenochtitlan. Edited by Jesús Monjarás-Ruiz, Elena Limón, and María de la Cruz Paillés Hernández. Mexico City and Puebla 1987.
Castañeda de la Paz, María (2008). "Apropiación de Elementos y Símbolos de Legitimidad entre la Nobleza Indígena. El Caso Del Cacicazgo Tlatelolca."  Anuario De Estudios Americanos. Directory of Open Access Journals.
Chimalpahin Cuauhtlehuantzin, Domingo Francisco de San Antón Muñon. Codex Chimalpahiin: Society and Politics in Mexico Tenochtitlan, Tlatelolco, Texcoco, Culhuacan, and Other Nahua Altepetl in Central Mexico. Arthur J.O. Anderson et al. Norman, Oklahoma: University of Oklahoma Press 1997.
Garduño, Ana. Conflictos y alianzas entre Tlatelolco y Tenochtitlan. Mexico City 1998.
Guilliem Arroyo, Salvador. Ofrendas a Ehecatll-Quetzalcoatl en Tlatelolco. Coleccion Científica INAH Num. 400. 1999. Mexico.
Matos Moctezuma, Eduardo. "Tlatelolco" in The Oxford Encyclopedia of Mesoamerican Culture'', vol. 3, pp. 230–31. Oxford University Press 2001.

See also 
List of Tlatelolco rulers
Codex of Tlatelolco
Tzilacatzin

Altepetl
.
Valley of Mexico
History of the Aztecs
14th century in the Aztec civilization
15th century in the Aztec civilization
1500s in the Aztec civilization
1510s in the Aztec civilization
1520s in the Aztec civilization
States and territories established in 1337
States and territories disestablished in the 1470s
14th-century establishments in Mexico
15th-century disestablishments in Mexico
1337 establishments
1473 disestablishments
States and territories disestablished in 1521
1521 disestablishments in Mexico